The barred hogfish (Bodianus scrofa) is a species of wrasse native to the eastern Atlantic Ocean, where it occurs around the Macaronesian  island groups of the Azores, Madeira, the Canary Islands and Cape Verde. It is of minor importance to local commercial fisheries. This species was formally described as Labrus scrofa in 1839 by Achille Valenciennes with the type locality  given as the Cape Verde Islands.

References

Further reading

External links
 

barred hogfish
Fauna of Macaronesia
Fauna of the Azores
Vertebrates of the Canary Islands
Fauna of Madeira
Fish of the East Atlantic
Taxa named by Achille Valenciennes
barred hogfish